Campylia is a genus of tachinid flies in the family Tachinidae.

See also 
 List of Tachinidae genera

References

External links 
 

 Campylia at insectoid.info

Tachinidae genera
Tachininae